Moira MacLeod (born 16 October 1957) is a retired female field hockey player from Scotland, who was a member of the British squad at the 1988 Summer Olympics.

External links
 

English female field hockey players
Field hockey players at the 1988 Summer Olympics
Olympic field hockey players of Great Britain
British female field hockey players
1957 births
Living people